The men's decathlon competition of the athletics events at the 2019 Pan American Games will take place between the 6 and 7 of August at the 2019 Pan American Games Athletics Stadium. The defending Pan American Games champion is Damian Warner from Canada.

Records
Prior to this competition, the existing world and Pan American Games records were as follows:

Schedule

Results
All times shown are in seconds.

100 m
Wind: -0.5 m/s (Heat 1), +1.6 m/s (Heat 2)

Long jump

Shot put

High jump

400 metres

110 metres hurdles
Wind:Heat 1: -0.6 m/s, Heat 2: +1.4 m/s

Discus throw

Pole vault

Javelin throw

1500 metres

Final standings

References

Athletics at the 2019 Pan American Games
2019